Oh God may refer to:

 An exclamation; similar to "oh no", "oh yes", "oh my", "aw goodness", "ah gosh", "ah gawd"; see interjection

Oh, God! franchise
 Oh, God! (film) (1977 film) aka "Oh, God! 1"
 Oh, God! Book II (1980 film) aka "Oh, God! 2"
 Oh, God! You Devil (1984 film) aka "Oh, God! 3"

Other uses
 O God, the Aftermath, a 2005 album by Norma Jean
 "Oh God" (song), on the 2013 album Winter Games by Chris Garneau

See also
 God (disambiguation)
 My God (disambiguation)
 Oh My God (disambiguation)
 Oh My Goddess (disambiguation)
 Goddess (disambiguation)
 Oh No (disambiguation)
 Oh (disambiguation)